China Fortune Land Development Co., Ltd.  is a publicly traded Chinese real estate developer, based in Beijing, headed by Wang Wenxue and focused on industrial parks. They are the current owners of Chinese Super League club Hebei China Fortune F.C., whom they purchased on 27 January 2015. Wang Wenxue still the largest shareholder of the company via China Fortune Land Development Holding.

As of May 2015, Wang Wenxue has an estimated net worth of US$4.1 billion.

China Fortune Land Development was a constituent of the CSI 300 Index (index for large to medium-sized companies in the mainland China's stock exchanges) as well as its sub-index CSI 100 Index. Since June 2017, it also part of Shanghai Stock Exchange's blue chip index: SSE 50 Index.

References

External links
 

Real estate companies of China
Companies listed on the Shanghai Stock Exchange
Companies in the CSI 100 Index